This is a list of Superfund sites in California designated under the Comprehensive Environmental Response, Compensation, and Liability Act (CERCLA) environmental law.  The CERCLA federal law of 1980 authorized the United States Environmental Protection Agency (EPA) to create a list of polluted locations requiring a long-term response to clean up hazardous material contaminations.

These locations are known as Superfund sites and are placed on the National Priorities List (NPL).  The NPL guides the EPA in "determining which sites warrant further investigation" for environmental remediation. As of March 10, 2011, there were 94 Superfund sites on the National Priorities List in California. Three additional sites have been proposed for entry on the list. Twelve sites have been cleaned up and removed from the list. One site was proposed for entry and then removed.

Superfund sites

Note
 While the site locates in Solano county according to California's official county boarder line, it is still considered as part of the University of California, Davis.

See also
Hazardous Waste and Substances Sites List
Pollution in California
List of Superfund sites in the United States
List of environmental issues
List of waste types
TOXMAP

References

External links
EPA list of proposed Superfund sites in California
EPA list of current Superfund sites in California
EPA list of Superfund site construction completions in California
EPA list of partially deleted Superfund sites in California
EPA list of deleted Superfund sites in California

Superfund
California

Superfund